The Prestige is a 1995 fantasy novel by British writer Christopher Priest. It tells the story of a prolonged feud between two stage magicians in late 1800s England. Its structure is that of a collection of diaries that were kept by the protagonists and later collated. The title derives from the novel's fictional practice of stage illusions having three parts: the setup, the performance, and the prestige (effect).

The novel received the James Tait Black Memorial Prize for best fiction and the World Fantasy Award for Best Novel.

Plot
The events of the past are told through the diaries of nineteenth century magicians Rupert Angier and Alfred Borden. The diaries are read by their great-grandchildren, Kate Angier and Andrew Westley (born Nicholas Borden) who meet in the present day, with the two diary accounts being interspersed with events of Kate's and Andrew's framing story throughout the novel. Andrew's story is related to his childhood, being adopted and his current job as a journalist. Kate's story is related to a traumatic event that happened when she was five years old where she witnessed a small boy murdered by her father. This leads her to search for Andrew who she believes is a key to the mystery. Kate believes that Andrew was the twin of the boy she witnessed die. As the diaries are read, the truth of the what happened to Andrew's twin is explained by the history of Angier and Borden.

The central plot focuses on a feud between the  magicians, begun in the fledgling years of their careers when Borden disrupts a fake seance being conducted by Angier and his wife after having conducted a previous one for one of Borden's relatives (Borden was upset that they were presenting it as real when he realized it was in truth an illusion). During a scuffle, Angier's pregnant wife Julia is thrown to the ground, resulting in a miscarriage. The two men are mutually antagonistic for many years afterwards as they rise to become world-renowned stage magicians, with the feud affecting the later generations of their families to come, specifically Kate and Andrew.

Borden develops a teleportation act called "The Transported Man", and later creates an improved version named "The New Transported Man", which appears to move him from one closed cabinet to another in the blink of an eye without appearing to pass through the intervening space. The act seems to defy physics and puts all previous magic acts to shame. The reader learns that Alfred Borden is actually not one man but two: identical twins named Albert and Frederick who share the identity of "Alfred Borden" secretly to ensure their professional success with "The New Transported Man". Angier suspects that Borden uses a double, but dismisses the idea because he thinks it is too easy.

Angier desperately tries to equal Borden's success. With the help of the acclaimed inventor Nikola Tesla, Angier develops an act called "In a Flash", which produces a similar result through a starkly different method. Tesla's device teleports a human being from one place to another by creating an exact physical duplicate at the required destination, into which the person's consciousness is instantly transmitted thus leaving the original physical subject behind. Because of this method, Angier is forced to devise a way to conceal the original (in order to preserve the illusion) whenever the trick is performed. He clinically refers to these near-lifeless shells in his diary as "the prestiges".

Angier's new act is as successful as Borden's. The infuriated and obsessed Borden attempts to discover how "In a Flash" is performed. During one performance he breaks into the backstage area and turns off the power to Angier's device, mistakenly believing the generator powering it is about to catch fire and turn the theatre ablaze. The subsequent teleportation is incomplete, and both the duplicated Angier and the "prestige" Angier survive as separate persons after this incident, but the original feels increasingly weak physically while the duplicate seems to lack physical substance. The original "prestige" Angier fakes his own death as part of a previous plan to put behind his public persona of a magician, and returns as the heir to his family estate of Caldlow House without any publicity. While there, he becomes terminally ill.

Angier had discovered Borden's secret as a twin prior to the accident that created his duplicate. Now alienated from the world by his ghostly form and consumed with thoughts of revenge, the Angier duplicate attacks one of the twins before a performance. However, Borden's apparent poor health, age, and the duplicate Angier's resurgent sense of morality prevent the assault from becoming murder. It is implied that this particular Borden twin dies a few days later, and the incorporeal Angier travels to meet the corporeal Angier, now living as the 14th Earl of Colderdale. They come into possession of Borden's diary, courtesy of a disgruntled third party in need of money, but publish it without revealing the twins' secret. Shortly afterwards, the corporeal Angier dies and his ghostly duplicate uses Tesla's device one last time to teleport himself into the body; hoping that either he will reanimate it and become whole again, or kill himself instantly and so reunite with his other self in death.

In the final section of the novel, Kate and Andrew's mystery is revealed. Andrew Westley goes into the Angier family vault. He finds all of Rupert Angier's near-lifeless shells (the prestiges) labelled with the date and place they were created. Andrew also finds a prestige of a small boy with the label Nicholas Julius Borden, with his place of creation listed as Caldlow House. It is then understood that Andrew himself never had a twin. The night Kate witnessed his "death", he had actually been cast into the Tesla device by Kate's father and had become a physical duplicate of himself. It is also revealed to Kate Angier and Andrew Westley that in Caldlow House, some form of Rupert Angier has continued to survive to the present day. It appears Angier's attempt to become whole again was successful. Angier confirms to Andrew, in their brief moment of contact in the vault, that Andrew was a physical duplicate of the small boy, just like Angier was a duplicate of all the prestiges in the vault.

Critical reception 
David Langford wrote in a 1996 review, "It seems entirely logical that Christopher Priest's latest novel should centre on stage magic and magicians. The particular brand of misdirection that lies at the heart of theatrical conjuring is also a favourite Priest literary ploy – the art of not so much fooling the audience as encouraging them to fool themselves... The final section is strange indeed, more Gothic than science fiction in flavour, heavy with metaphorical power. There are revelations, and more is implied about the peculiar nature of the Angier/Tesla effect's payoff or 'prestige' – a term used in this sense by both magicians. The trick is done; before and after, Priest has rolled up both sleeves; his hands are empty and he fixes you with an honest look. And yet ... you realise that it is necessary to read The Prestige again. It's an extraordinary performance, his best book in years, perhaps his best ever. Highly recommended."

Publishers Weekly said, "This is a complex tale that must have been extremely difficult to tell in exactly the right sequence, while still maintaining a series of shocks to the very end. Priest has brought it off with great imagination and skill. It's only fair to say, though, that the book's very considerable narrative grip is its principal virtue. The characters and incidents have a decidedly Gothic cast, and only the restraint that marks the story's telling keeps it on the rails."

Elizabeth Hand wrote, "There is a certain amount of grim humor to The Prestige, the blatant Can-You-Top-This? careerism of dueling prestidigitators whose feud is carried out against the lush backdrop of fin-de-siècle London. And the novel provides the pleasures of a mystery as well, as the reader attempts to find the man (or men) behind the curtain, and discover the true parentage of Andrew Westley, who may or may not be related to Borden. But at its core The Prestige is a horror novel, and a particularly terrifying one because its secret is revealed so slowly, and in such splendid language... The Prestige is both disturbing and exhilarating – one closes the book shaken, wondering how it was done; and eager to see what the master illusionist will produce for his next trick."

Adam Kirkman called the novel "vastly underrated... Priest weaves together a tale of two feuding stage magicians at the turn of the century, a dark but mesmerising story that sees two men become consumed with, and eventually destroyed by, obsession. While the film hammers you over the head with clues about the final twist, so much so that you feel embarrassed when re-watching it, Priest's novel is more subtle, although a smart reader is in on the trick from the start. The real beauty of this novel is the characters, who are fleshed out more fully here than on screen, and the magical elements of the story achieve a fantastical, creepy edge. If you enjoyed the film, then Priest's novel is grander in scope and more chilling in nature, and is a gem that should not be ignored."

The Guardian review said, "Behind all the surface trickery lies an intelligent and thoughtful novel about the nature of illusion and secrecy, and about the damage done to those who appoint themselves keepers of such dangerous secrets."

A review in Kliatt of the audiobook version narrated by Simon Vance described it as "a spellbinding and entirely original neo-gothic thriller that moves the listener adroitly from the world of staged illusion to the otherworldly, from the historical...to the horror-laden, with all sorts of strange and dazzling stops along the way. The plot is convoluted and occasionally technical, spanning generations and incorporating multiple narrators and a large cast of characters. A lesser audiobook narrator might inadvertently muddle the story, but, as usual, Vance displays a dramatic and vocal range that is more than equal to his task. He enhances Priest's novel with superb pacing and a host of highly convincing voices and accents."

Awards and nominations
British Fantasy Award nominee, 1995
James Tait Black Memorial Prize winner, 1996
Bram Stoker Award nominee, 1996
World Fantasy Award winner, 1996
Arthur C. Clarke Award nominee, 1996

2006 film adaptation

A motion picture adaptation, which had been optioned by Newmarket Films, and which was directed by Christopher Nolan, was released on 20 October 2006 in the United States. It stars Christian Bale and Hugh Jackman as Borden and Angier, respectively, as well as Michael Caine, Scarlett Johansson and David Bowie. The novel was adapted by Christopher and Jonathan Nolan.

See also

 Look-alike

References and notes

External links
 Christopher Priest's website

1995 British novels
Novels by Christopher Priest
1995 science fiction novels
Steampunk novels
Epistolary novels
English novels
British novels adapted into films
World Fantasy Award for Best Novel-winning works
Novels about cloning
Fictional rivalries
Science fiction novels adapted into films